Lamine Moise Cissé (born 12 December 1971) is a Senegalese footballer. He played in 12 matches for the Senegal national football team from 1993 to 2000. He was also named in Senegal's squad for the 1994 African Cup of Nations tournament.

References

1971 births
Living people
Senegalese footballers
Senegal international footballers
1994 African Cup of Nations players
Association football defenders
Footballers from Dakar